The 2018–19 Ohio State Buckeyes women's basketball team represented the Ohio State University during the 2018–19 NCAA Division I women's basketball season. The Buckeyes, led by 6th year head coach Kevin McGuff, played their home games at Value City Arena and are a member of the Big Ten Conference. They finished the season 14–15, 10–8 in Big Ten play to finish in fifth place. They lost in the second round of the Big Ten women's basketball tournament to Wisconsin. They received an automatic bid to the WNIT where they got upset by Morehead State in the first round.

Roster

Schedule and results

|-
!colspan=9 style=| Exhibition

|-
!colspan=9 style=| Non-conference regular season

|-
!colspan=9 style=| Big Ten regular season

|-
! colspan=9 style=| Big Ten Women's Tournament

|-
! colspan=9 style=| WNIT

Rankings

See also
 2018–19 Ohio State Buckeyes men's basketball team

References

Ohio State Buckeyes women's basketball seasons
Ohio State
Ohio State Buckeyes
Ohio State Buckeyes
Ohio State